Emmanuel Okocha (born 20 December 1968) is a Nigerian former footballer who played as a midfielder for Enugu Rangers, VfB Marburg, Eintracht Haiger and SV Wehen, as well as the Nigeria national team. He competed at the 1990 African Cup of Nations, and is the older brother of Jay-Jay Okocha.

References

1968 births
Living people
Nigerian footballers
Nigeria international footballers
Rangers International F.C. players
VfB Marburg players
SV Wehen Wiesbaden players
Association football midfielders
1990 African Cup of Nations players
Nigerian expatriate footballers
Nigerian expatriate sportspeople in Germany
Expatriate footballers in Germany